Fred Ott's Sneeze (also known as Edison Kinetoscopic Record of a Sneeze) is an 1894 short, black-and-white, silent film shot by William K.L. Dickson and featuring Fred Ott. It is the oldest surviving motion picture with a copyright.

In the approximately five-second film, which was shot in January 1894, one of Thomas Edison's assistants, Fred Ott, takes a pinch of snuff and sneezes. According to the Library of Congress, the film was "made for publicity purposes, as a series of still photographs to accompany an article in Harper's Weekly."

In 2015, the United States Library of Congress selected the film for preservation in the National Film Registry, finding it "culturally, historically, or aesthetically significant."

Production
The film was produced by the Edison Manufacturing Company, which had begun making films in 1890 under the direction of Dickson, one of the earliest film pioneers. It was filmed within the Black Maria studio at West Orange, New Jersey, which was the first U.S. movie studio. It was filmed between January 2, 1894, and January 7, 1894 and was displayed, at the time, through the means of a Kinetoscope.

Current status 

As a film published in the United States before 1978 and more than 95 years ago, its copyright expired and the work is in the public domain in the United States. In countries where copyright expires 70 years after the author's death, the copyright of the film expired in 2006. Originally, the film was submitted to the Library of Congress as a "paper print" (a photographic record of each frame of the film) for copyright purposes. A digital copy is now kept by the Library of Congress and can be viewed on their American Memory website. This short film was featured at the 30th Annual Academy Awards, and was included as part of the TV documentary, The First 100 Years: A Celebration of American Movies.

See also 
 1894 in film
Sneeze
The Horse in Motion

References

External links 

 Library of Congress
 Video of Fred Ott's Sneeze on YouTube
 
 
 

1894 films
American short documentary films
American black-and-white films
American silent short films
Articles containing video clips
Thomas Edison
Films directed by William Kennedy Dickson
Films shot in New Jersey
1890s short documentary films
Black-and-white documentary films
United States National Film Registry films
Edison Manufacturing Company films
Sneeze
1890s American films